Katrina-Lee Gorry (born 13 August 1992) is an Australian professional soccer player who plays as a midfielder for Brisbane Roar in the A-League and for the Australia national team. She was the 2014 Asia's Footballer of the Year.

Club career
Gorry played youth football for Mount Gravatt. From 2009 to 2012, Gorry played one season each for the Australian first division clubs Melbourne Victory, Adelaide United, and again Melbourne Victory. In the summer of 2012, she moved to Canadian W League participant Ottawa Fury, with whom she secured the championship.

Brisbane Roar, 2012–2020
Gorry joined the Brisbane Roar ahead of the 2012–13 W-League Season. In October 2017, Gorry become the first member of the Roar to sign a multi-year contract, as she signed a two-year deal to remain in Brisbane.

FC Kansas City, 2014
In March 2014, it was announced the Gorry was joining FC Kansas City in the NWSL. She made 10 appearances for the team as they won the 2014 NWSL Championship.

Vegalta Sendai, 2017
In 2017, Gorry spent a season with Vegalta Sendai in Japan.

Utah Royals FC, 2018
On 14 February 2018, she joined the Utah Royals FC, marking her return to the NWSL. She made 16 appearances for Utah in 2018. After the season, Utah declined her contract option and she was waived by the club.

Avaldsnes, 2020–present
On 29 January 2020, Gorry signed with Avaldsnes in the Toppserien for the 2020 season. Gorry played her first game for Avaldsnes on 18 July 2020, playing the full 90 minutes in a 1–0 win over Arna-Bjørnar. Her first appearance for the side earned her a spot in the Toppserien team of the week.

Loan to Brisbane Roar
In December 2020, Brisbane Roar announced that Gorry will return to the club for the 2020–21 W-League season on loan from Avaldsnes.

International career

Gorry made her debut for Australia on 11 July 2012 as a substitute against Japan.  In May 2014, Australia played in the 2014 AFC Women's Asian Cup. Gorry played in all five games, scored three goals, and reached the final against Japan, where Japan won 1–0. Gorry won AFC Women's Player of the Year and FFA Women's Player of the Year in 2014.

In May 2015, Gorry was named to the Australia's 23-player roster for the 2015 FIFA World Cup. She appeared in four out of Australia's five matches. The Matildas finished second in their group and advanced to the knockout stage. They defeated Brazil in the Round of 16 but lost to Japan in the quarter-finals.

Australia defeated Japan 3-1 in the qualifying for the Olympic Games. Gorry attended her first Olympics in 2016. She appeared in all four matches for Australia at Rio 2016. Their quarter-final match against Brazil was tied 0–0 after extra time and went to penalties. Gorry was the fourth person to take a PK for Australia, she did not convert her penalty and Brazil went on to win the match 7–6 on penalties.

Gorry was part of the Matildas squad that won the 2017 Tournament of Nations and defeated the United States for the first time ever.

At the 2018 AFC Women's Asian Cup Gorry appeared in four matches. Australia advanced to the Championship Game by defeating Vietnam but lost to Japan 1–0 in the final. Australia qualified for the 2019 FIFA World Cup.

An injury at the end of the year prevented her from participating in the Cup of Nations in late February/early March 2019. She back as a last-minute substitute in the 5-3 loss to the USA on April 5, 2019. She was nomiated for the World Cup squad on May 14, 2019.  She came on as a substitute in the 69th minute when the score was 1-1 against Italy and conceded a goal with her team in the fifth minute of added time to make it 2-1. She then featured in the final group game in the 4-1 win against Jamaica, where she provided the assist for one of Sam Kerr's four goals. In the round of 16, the penalty shootout was lost against former world champion Norway.

In the successfully completed qualification for the 2020 Olympics Games, she played in two of five games. After that, she was initially not nominated again because of her pregnancy. Since April 2022 she has been nominated regularly again.

Career statistics

International goals

Honors

International
 AFC Olympic Qualifying Tournament: 2016
 Tournament of Nations: 2017

Club
Ottawa Fury

 2012: W League champion
Brisbane Roar
 W-League Premiership: 2012–13, 2017–18

FC Kansas City
 NWSL Championship: 2014

Individual
 AFC Women's Player of the Year: 2014
 FFA Female Footballer of the Year: 2014
 Lady Reds Supporters Player of the Year: 2010/11

References

External links
Katrina Gorry profile at BrisbaneRoar.com.au

1992 births
Living people
Australian women's soccer players
Australian people of Irish descent
Melbourne Victory FC (A-League Women) players
Adelaide United FC (A-League Women) players
Brisbane Roar FC (A-League Women) players
Soccer players from Brisbane
FC Kansas City players
Mynavi Vegalta Sendai Ladies players
A-League Women players
National Women's Soccer League players
Nadeshiko League players
Expatriate women's soccer players in the United States
Australia women's international soccer players
2015 FIFA Women's World Cup players
Footballers at the 2016 Summer Olympics
Women's association football midfielders
Australian expatriate sportspeople in the United States
Olympic soccer players of Australia
Utah Royals FC players
Australian expatriate sportspeople in Canada
2019 FIFA Women's World Cup players
Australian expatriate women's soccer players
Vittsjö GIK players
Australian expatriate sportspeople in Japan
Australian expatriate sportspeople in Sweden
Australian expatriate sportspeople in Norway
Avaldsnes IL players
Damallsvenskan players
Toppserien players
Expatriate women's footballers in Norway
Expatriate women's footballers in Japan
Expatriate women's footballers in Sweden
Expatriate women's soccer players in Canada
Ottawa Fury (women) players
USL W-League (1995–2015) players